Martin Matschinsky (b. 4 July 1921, Grötzingen, Karlsruhe, Baden — 24 January 2020, Berlin) and Brigitte Matschinsky-Denninghoff (born Meier-Denninghoff; 2 June 1921, Berlin — 11 April 2011, Berlin) were a German artist-couple known for their monumental abstract sculptures.

Further reading 
 Erich G. Ranfft. "Matschinsky-Denninghoff." In Grove Art Online. Oxford Art Online, (accessed February 9, 2012; subscription required).

External links 
 
 Entry for Brigitte Matschinsky-Denninghoff on the Union List of Artist Names
 Entry for Martin Matschinsky on the Union List of Artist Names
 
 

German sculptors
Abstract sculptors
Married couples
Recipients of the Order of Merit of Berlin